Jill Yvette Crainshaw (born 1962) is an American theologian and liturgical scholar.

Crainshaw earned a bachelor of arts degree at Wake Forest University in 1984, followed by a Master of Divinity from Southeastern Baptist Theological Seminary in 1987. She then completed a doctorate at Union Presbyterian Seminary, in Virginia, in 1997. Crainshaw is the Blackburn Professor of Worship and Liturgical Theology at the Wake Forest University School of Divinity, and served as interim dean of the seminary between the terms of Gail R. O'Day and Jonathan L. Walton. She was appointed Vice Dean of Faculty Development and Academic Initiatives in 2019. Crainshaw delivered the 2019 Aidan Kavanagh Lecture at Yale Divinity School. She is an ordained Minister of Word and Sacrament in the Presbyterian Church, U.S.A.

Crainshaw is the author of several monographs, including Wise and Discerning Hearts: Introduction to a Wisdom Liturgical Theology (Liturgical Press, 2000), Keep the Call: Leading the Congregation Without Losing Your Soul (Abingdon Press, 2002), Wisdom’s Dwelling Place (OSL Publications, 2010), They Spin with Their Hands: Women’s Ordination Rites: Renewing God’s Story with God’s People (OSL Publications, 2015), and When I in Awesome Wonder: Liturgy Distilled from Daily Life (Liturgical Press, 2017). Crainshaw published her first book of poetry, Cedars in Snowy Places (Library Partners Press) in 2018.

References

1962 births
Living people
Wake Forest University alumni
Union Presbyterian Seminary alumni
Wake Forest University faculty
American university and college faculty deans
Women deans (academic)
21st-century American theologians
Women Christian theologians
20th-century American theologians
21st-century American women writers
20th-century American women writers
Liturgists
American women academics